Adeane is an English surname. People with this surname include:

 Charles Adeane (1863–1943), British army officer
 Edward Adeane (born 1939), private secretary to Prince of Wales
 Edward Stanley Adeane, (1836–1902), Admiral of the Royal Navy
 Henry John Adeane (1789–1847), English politician
 Henry John Adeane (1833–1870), English politician
 James Whorwood Adeane (1740–1802), MP
 Michael Adeane, Baron Adeane (1910–1984), private secretary to Queen Elizabeth II
 Madeline Adeane (1869–1941), of The Wyndham Sisters portrait

See also 
 Adéane, a rural community in Ziguinchor Region, Senegal

References